Cyril Roy Weatherly (February 25, 1915 – January 19, 1991), nicknamed "Stormy", was an American professional baseball player whose career extended for two decades (1934–1943; 1946–1954; 1958). The native of Tyler County, Texas, an outfielder, appeared in 811 Major League games over ten seasons for the Cleveland Indians, New York Yankees and New York Giants.  Weatherly batted left-handed and threw right-handed. Despite his relatively small size — he stood 5 ft 6½ in (1.69 m) tall and weighed  — he hit more than 100 home runs in minor league baseball.

As a Major Leaguer, Weatherly collected 794 hits, with 152 doubles, 44 triples, and 43 home runs. Defensively, he recorded a .975 fielding percentage playing at all three outfield positions. Traded to the Yankees after the  season, he appeared in one game as a pinch hitter during the 1943 World Series, popping out in the eighth inning of Game 2 against Mort Cooper of the St. Louis Cardinals. Although the Yankees lost that game, that was the only contest they would drop as they won the Series in five games.

Weatherly missed the 1944 and 1945 seasons while serving in the United States Army during World War II.

References

External links

1915 births
1991 deaths
United States Army personnel of World War II
Baltimore Orioles (IL) players
Baseball players from Texas
Bismarck Barons players
Cleveland Indians players
Indianapolis Indians players
Major League Baseball outfielders
Minneapolis Millers (baseball) players
New Orleans Pelicans (baseball) players
New York Giants (NL) players
New York Yankees players
Oakland Oaks (baseball) players
Opelousas Indians players
People from Tyler County, Texas
Richmond Virginians (minor league) players
San Antonio Missions players
Williston Oilers players